Wally Heider Studios was a recording studio founded in San Francisco in 1969 by recording engineer and studio owner Wally Heider. Between 1969 and 1980, numerous notable artists recorded at the studios, including Creedence Clearwater Revival, Jefferson Airplane, Crosby, Stills, Nash & Young, and The Grateful Dead. The studio changed ownership in 1980 and was renamed Hyde Street Studios, which is still in operation today.

History

Background
Heider had apprenticed with as an engineer and mixer at Bill Putnam's United Western Recorders studio complex in Hollywood in the early 1960s, after which he founded Wally Heider Recording with the opening of Studio 3 at 1604 N. Cahuenga Boulevard in Hollywood. Heider and his crew gained notoriety for top notch engineering that resulted in excellent studio and remote location recordings, including sessions with The Beach Boys, and Crosby, Stills & Nash.

In 1967, Heider assisted in the live recording of the Monterey Pop Festival. Bay-area artists like Jefferson Airplane, Quicksilver Messenger Service and The Grateful Dead had been recording in Los Angeles and New York, and Heider saw the need for musicians involved in the nascent San Francisco Sound to have their own well-equipped and staffed recording studio close to home.

Hyde Street
In March 1969, Heider opened Wally Heider Studios at 245 Hyde Street, San Francisco, between Turk and Eddy Streets, across the street from Black Hawk jazz club, in a building that had previously been used by 20th Century Fox for film offices, screening rooms and storage. The studios were built by Dave Mancini.

Heider planned four studios—A and B on the ground floor and C and D upstairs. However, studio B was never finished and instead became a game room. The studio commenced operations in May 1969 upon completion of Studio C, with staff that included General Manager Mel Tanner, Booking Agent Ginger Mews, Technician Harry Sitam, and Staff Engineer Russ Gary. Studio C's dimensions were similar to Heider's Studio 3 in Hollywood—though its control room, instead of being at the end the room, was parallel to Studio C's long side. The walls were kept from being parallel with square gypsum devices that were used as mid-range sound diffusers and absorbers. At the Grateful Dead's request, its studio doors were covered with airbrushed paintings. Studios A and D became operational a few months later.

Frank DeMedio, who had designed the 24-channel mixing console and an 8-channel monitor and cue—replicated for Heider's Studio 3 and remote truck in Hollywood, built all of the custom equipment and mixing console for Heider's new Hyde Street studios, using Universal Audio (UA) console components, military grade switches and level controls, and a simple audio path that used one preamp for everything in a channel. Monitor speakers were Altec 604-Es with McIntosh 275 tube power amps.

The first release out of Studio C was Jefferson Airplane’s Volunteers, which was also the first album they recorded in their hometown. Between 1969 and 1970, many other high-profile acts followed, including Harry Nilsson, Crosby Stills Nash and Young, the Steve Miller Band. Creedence Clearwater Revival recorded several albums in that room, and named their record, Cosmo's Factory after the "factory" at Studio C (Cosmo's Factory was CCR's rehearsal area). Engineers and staff at the studio during that time included Bill Halverson, Stephen Barncard, and Glyn Johns.

While Crosby Stills Nash and Young were recording, Studio D (an exact replica of Heider's Studio 3 in Hollywood) opened. Among the first things to be recorded in Studio D was Jerry Garcia's steel guitar overdub for Teach Your Children, while the live recording setup was kept intact in Studio C where CSNY recorded. In that same period, Deane Jensen supervised installation of a new Quad Eight console in Studio A. Santana and John Hall used Studio D a few times. CBS Records had a priority lease on Studio D for a year, before eventually taking over Coast Recorders as their west coast recording facility. Many other artists followed.

In 1978, Heider sold the studio and its name to Filmways, but remained as manager until 1980 when Filmways sold it to a partnership composed of Dan Alexander, Tom Sharples, and Michael Ward.  The three partners renamed the business Hyde Street Studios, which is still an operating recording studio as of 2019, now owned solely by Michael Ward.

Albums recorded

1969
Bad Moon Rising – Creedence Clearwater Revival
Volunteers – Jefferson Airplane
Green River – Creedence Clearwater Revival
Shady Grove – Quicksilver Messenger Service
Zephyr – Zephyr
Neil Young – Neil Young
Everybody Knows This Is Nowhere – Neil Young with Crazy Horse

1970
Déjà Vu – Crosby, Stills, Nash & Young
Eric Burdon Declares "War" – Eric Burdon and War
Abraxas – Santana
Blows Against the Empire – Paul Kantner
American Beauty – The Grateful Dead
Portrait – The 5th Dimension
The Black-Man's Burdon – Eric Burdon and War
Cosmo's Factory – Creedence Clearwater Revival
Tarkio – Brewer & Shipley
Pendulum – Creedence Clearwater Revival
The Original Human Being – Blue Cheer

1971
Bark – Jefferson Airplane
Sunfighter – Paul Kantner and Grace Slick
Chilliwack – Chilliwack
Electric Warrior – T. Rex
If I Could Only Remember My Name – David Crosby
Songs for Beginners – Graham Nash
Tupelo Honey – Van Morrison
Shake Off the Demon – Brewer & Shipley
Guilty! – Eric Burdon and Jimmy Witherspoon
Grin – Grin
Papa John Creach – Papa John Creach
Moments – Boz Scaggs
Endless Boogie – John Lee Hooker
Mwandishi –  Herbie Hancock

1972
Graham Nash David Crosby – Crosby & Nash
Long John Silver – Jefferson Airplane
Burgers – Hot Tuna
First Taste of Sin – Cold Blood
1+1 – Grin
Rural Space – Brewer & Shipley
Come by 1
Saint Dominic's Preview – Van Morrison
Toulouse Street – The Doobie Brothers
Garcia – Jerry Garcia
Ace – Bob Weir
Rowan Brothers – Rowan Brothers
Livin' the Life – Chris and Lorin Rowan
You're Not Elected, Charlie Brown – Vince Guaraldi Quintet (television soundtrack)

1973
Byrds – The Byrds
Head Hunters – Herbie Hancock
Baron von Tollbooth & The Chrome Nun – Paul Kantner, Grace Slick and David Freiberg
Child of Nature – Jack Traylor and Steelwind
Full Sail – Loggins and Messina
How Time Flys – David Ossman and The Firesign Theatre
GP – Gram Parsons
Deliver the Word – War
Be What You Want To – Link Wray
Betty Davis – Betty Davis
Sextant – Herbie Hancock
Roger McGuinn – Roger McGuinn
There's No Time for Love, Charlie Brown – Vince Guaraldi Quintet (television soundtrack)
A Charlie Brown Thanksgiving – Vince Guaraldi Quintet (television soundtrack)

1974
Grievous Angel – Gram Parsons
Manhole – Grace Slick
The Phosphorescent Rat – Hot Tuna
Early Flight – Jefferson Airplane
Dragon Fly – Grace Slick, Paul Kantner and Jefferson Starship
Quah – Jorma Kaukonen
What Were Once Vices Are Now Habits – The Doobie Brothers
ST11621 – Brewer & Shipley
Look at the Fool – Tim Buckley
The Heart of Saturday Night – Tom Waits
Southern Comfort – The Crusaders
Peace on You – Roger McGuinn
No Other – Gene Clark
It's a Mystery, Charlie Brown – Vince Guaraldi Quartet (television soundtrack)
It's the Easter Beagle, Charlie Brown – Vince Guaraldi Quartet (television soundtrack)

1975
Survival of the Fittest – The Headhunters
America's Choice – Hot Tuna
Red Octopus – Jefferson Starship
Yellow Fever – Hot Tuna
The Tubes – The Tubes
Tale Spinnin' – Weather Report
Chain Reaction – The Crusaders
Adventures in Paradise – Minnie Riperton
Atlantic Crossing – Rod Stewart
Song for America – Kansas
Saturday Night Special – Norman Connors
Steppin' – Pointer Sisters
Venus and Mars – Wings
Coke – Coke Escovedo
Angel – Angel
Tell Me The Truth – Jon Hendricks
An Evening with John Denver – John Denver (recorded live at Universal Amphitheater)
Be My Valentine, Charlie Brown – Vince Guaraldi Trio (television soundtrack)
You're a Good Sport, Charlie Brown – Vince Guaraldi Trio (television soundtrack)

1976
It's Arbor Day, Charlie Brown – Vince Guaraldi Trio (television soundtrack)
Spitfire – Jefferson Starship
Heritage – Eddie Henderson
Hoppkorv – Hot Tuna
Amigos – Santana
Small Change – Tom Waits
Salongo – Ramsey Lewis
Alessi – Alessi Brothers
Legs Diamond – Legs Diamond

1977
Rumours – Fleetwood Mac
Thunderbyrd – Roger McGuinn
Conquistador – Maynard Ferguson
American Stars 'n Bars – Neil Young
Having a Party – Pointer Sisters
Donald Clark Osmond – Donny Osmond

1978
Earth – Jefferson Starship
Double Dose – Hot Tuna
Do It All Night – Curtis Mayfield
Comes a Time – Neil Young
Jass-Ay-Lay-Dee – Ohio Players
Streamline – Lenny White
Twin Sons of Different Mothers – Dan Fogelberg and Tim Weisberg

1979
Jorma – Jorma Kaukonen
Connections and Disconnections – Funkadelic

1981
Law and Order – Lindsey Buckingham

1982
One from the Heart – Tom Waits and Crystal Gayle
Right Back At Cha! – Dynasty
Long After Dark – Tom Petty and the Heartbreakers

References

Companies based in San Francisco
Recording studios in California
Music of the San Francisco Bay Area
1969 establishments in California